Distel hitch is a friction hitch knot used to attach a carabiner to a rope, allowing a climber to descend or ascend. The knot is similar to the prusik knot, however it grips the rope more consistently, making for increased climber control.

See also
List of friction hitch knots

References